was a legendary local ruler of Okinawa Island. Shunbajunki was the second ruler of the Shunten dynasty. He succeeded his father Shunten in 1237.

Shunbajunki's reign is noted for the construction of Shuri Castle and the introduction of the Japanese kana writing system. The Chinese language and writing system was not to be introduced until roughly a century later; even after that time, government documents continued to be written in kana, as did much poetry.

Shunbajunki died in 1248, and was succeeded by his son Gihon.

Notes

References
 Kerr, George H. (1965). Okinawa, the History of an Island People. Rutland, Vermont: C.E. Tuttle Co. OCLC  39242121
Shinzato, Keiji, et al. Okinawa-ken no rekishi (History of Okinawa Prefecture). Tokyo: Yamakawa Publishing, 1996. p. 38.

1185 births
1248 deaths
Kings of Ryūkyū
13th-century Ryukyuan people